The 2021–22 Los Angeles Kings season was the 55th season (54th season of play) for the National Hockey League franchise that was established  on June 5, 1967. On April 26, 2022, the Kings clinched a playoff berth for the first time since 2018 after the Dallas Stars defeated the Vegas Golden Knights in a shootout. They were defeated in the first round of the playoffs by the Edmonton Oilers, in seven games.

During the season, the Kings' home arena Staples Center changed its name to Crypto.com Arena, effective December 25, 2021, as part of a new naming rights agreement. This season would mark Dustin Brown's last, as he announced on April 28, 2022 his intention to retire following the playoffs.

Standings

Divisional standings

Western Conference

Schedule and results

Preseason

|- style="background:#fcc;"
| 1 || September 27 || @ Arizona Coyotes || 1–2 || || Villalta  || Gila River Arena || 7,532 || 0–1–0 || 
|- style="background:#cfc;"
| 2 || September 28 || @ San Jose Sharks || 4–3 || || Sparks || SAP Center || 6,837 || 1–1–0 || 
|- style="background:#cfc;"
| 3 || September 30 || Vegas Golden Knights || 3–1 || || Sparks || Vivint Arena || || 2–1–0 || 
|- style="background:#fcc;"
| 4 || October 1 || @ Vegas Golden Knights || 0–4 || || Petersen || T-Mobile Arena ||  17,542 || 2–2–0 || 
|- style="background:#fcc;"
| 5 || October 5 || Arizona Coyotes || 1–4 || || Quick || Staples Center ||  7,206 || 2–3–0 || 
|- style="background:#cfc;"
| 6 || October 6 || @ Anaheim Ducks || 6–3 || || Petersen || Honda Center || || 3–3–0 || 
|- style="background:#fff;"
| 7 || October 9 || Anaheim Ducks || 3–4 || OT || Quick || Staples Center ||  12,132 || 3–3–1 || 
|-

Regular season 

|- style="background:#cfc;"
| 1 || October 14 || Vegas Golden Knights || 6–2 || || Petersen || Staples Center || 16,589 || 1–0–0 || 2 || 
|- style="background:#fcc;"
| 2 || October 16 || Minnesota Wild || 2–3 || || Quick || Staples Center || 12,590 || 1–1–0 || 2 || 
|- style="background:#fcc;"
| 3 || October 19 || @ Nashville Predators || 1–2 || || Petersen || Bridgestone Arena || 17,159 || 1–2–0 || 2 || 
|- style="background:#fff;"
| 4 || October 22 || @ Dallas Stars || 2–3 || OT || Quick || American Airlines Center || 18,532 || 1–2–1 || 3 || 
|- style="background:#fcc;"
| 5 || October 23 || @ St. Louis Blues || 3–7 || || Petersen || Enterprise Center || 18,096 || 1–3–1 || 3 || 
|- style="background:#fcc;"
| 6 || October 25 || @ St. Louis Blues || 0–3 || || Quick || Enterprise Center || 16,655 || 1–4–1 || 3 || 
|- style="background:#fcc;"
| 7 || October 28 || Winnipeg Jets || 2–3 || || Quick || Staples Center || 11,207 || 1–5–1 || 3 || 
|- style="background:#cfc;"
| 8 || October 30 || Montreal Canadiens || 5–2 || || Petersen || Staples Center || 12,785 || 2–5–1 || 5 || 
|- style="background:#cfc;"
| 9 || October 31 || Buffalo Sabres || 3–2 || || Quick || Staples Center || 12,101 || 3–5–1 || 7 || 

|- style="background:#cfc;"
| 10 || November 3 || St. Louis Blues || 3–2 || SO || Quick|| Staples Center || 11,756 || 4–5–1 || 9 || 
|- style="background:#cfc;"
| 11 || November 5 || New Jersey Devils || 3–2 || OT || Petersen || Staples Center || 16,045 || 5–5–1 || 11 || 
|- style="background:#cfc;"
| 12 || November 8 || @ Toronto Maple Leafs || 5–1 || || Quick || Scotiabank Arena || 18,983 || 6–5–1 || 13 || 
|- style="background:#cfc;"
| 13 || November 9 || @ Montreal Canadiens || 3–2 || OT || Petersen || Bell Centre || 20,042 || 7–5–1 || 15 || 
|- style="background:#cfc;"
| 14 || November 11 || @ Ottawa Senators || 2–0 || || Quick || Canadian Tire Centre || 8,221 || 8–5–1 || 17 || 
|- style="background:#fff;"
| 15 || November 13 || @ Winnipeg Jets || 2–3 || OT || Petersen || Canada Life Centre || 13,776 || 8–5–2 || 18 || 
|- style="background:#fcc;"
| 16 || November 17 || Washington Capitals || 0–2 || || Quick || Staples Center || 14,694 || 8–6–2 || 18 || 
|- style="background:#fcc;"
| 17 || November 20 || Carolina Hurricanes || 4–5 || || Petersen || Staples Center || 15,744 || 8–7–2 || 18 || 
|- style="background:#fff;"
| 18 || November 21 || Arizona Coyotes || 1–2 || OT || Quick || Staples Center || 13,474 || 8–7–3 || 19 || 
|- style="background:#fcc;"
| 19 || November 24 || Toronto Maple Leafs || 2–6 || || Quick || Staples Center || 15,166 || 8–8–3 || 19 || 
|- style="background:#cfc;"
| 20 || November 27 || Ottawa Senators || 4–2 || || Petersen || Staples Center || 15,406 || 9–8–3 || 21 ||  
|- style="background:#fff;"
| 21 || November 30 || Anaheim Ducks || 4–5 || SO || Quick || Staples Center || 15,276 || 9–8–4 || 22 ||  
|-

|- style="background:#fcc;"
| 22 || December 2 || Calgary Flames || 2–3 || || Petersen || Staples Center || 13,241 || 9–9–4 || 22 ||  
|- style="background:#cfc;"
| 23 || December 5 || @ Edmonton Oilers || 5–1 || || Quick || Rogers Place || 15,658 || 10–9–4 || 24 ||  
|- style="background:#fcc;"
| 24 || December 6 || @ Vancouver Canucks || 0–4 || || Petersen || Rogers Arena || 18,591 || 10–10–4 || 24 ||  
|- style="background:#cfc;"
| 25 || December 9 || Dallas Stars || 4–0 || || Quick || Staples Center || 13,659 || 11–10–4 || 26 ||  
|- style="background:#cfc;"
| 26 || December 11 || Minnesota Wild || 2–1 || || Quick || Staples Center || 15,897 || 12–10–4 || 28 || 
|- style="background:#fff;"
| 27 || December 14 || @ Tampa Bay Lightning || 2–3 || OT || Quick || Amalie Arena || 19,092 || 12–10–5 || 29 || 
|- style="background:#cfc;"
| 28 || December 16 || @ Florida Panthers || 4–1 || || Quick || FLA Live Arena || 14,458 || 13–10–5 || 31 || 
|- style="background:#fcc;"
| 29 || December 18 || @ Carolina Hurricanes || 1–5 || || Quick || PNC Arena || 16,238 || 13–11–5 || 31 || 
|- style="background:#cfc;"
| 30 || December 19 || @ Washington Capitals || 3–2 || || Sparks || Capital One Arena || 18,573 || 14–11–5 || 33 || 
|- style="background:#ccc;"
| — || December 22 || Edmonton Oilers || colspan="8"|Postponed due to COVID-19. Moved to February February 15.
|- style="background:#ccc;"
| — || December 23 || @ Vegas Golden Knights || colspan="8"|Postponed due to COVID-19. Moved to February 18.
|- style="background:#ccc;"
| — || December 27 || @ Arizona Coyotes || colspan="8"|Postponed due to COVID-19. Moved to February 19.
|- style="background:#fcc;"
| 31 || December 28 || Vegas Golden Knights || 3–6 || || Quick || Crypto.com Arena  || 14,887 || 14–12–5 || 33 || 
|- style="background:#cfc;"
| 32 || December 30 || Vancouver Canucks || 2–1 || SO || Quick || Crypto.com Arena || 14,514 || 15–12–5 || 35 || 
|-

|- style="background:#cfc;"
| 33 || January 1 || Philadelphia Flyers || 6–3 || || Quick || Crypto.com Arena || 14,301 || 16–12–5 || 37 || 
|- style="background:#fcc;"
| 34 || January 6 || Nashville Predators || 2–4 || || Quick || Crypto.com Arena || 14,359 || 16–13–5 || 37 || 
|- style="background:#cfc;"
| 35 || January 8 || Detroit Red Wings || 4–0 || || Petersen || Crypto.com Arena || 17,321 || 17–13–5 || 39 || 
|- style="background:#cfc;"
| 36 || January 10 || New York Rangers || 3–1 || || Petersen || Crypto.com Arena || 13,558 || 18–13–5 || 41 ||
|- style="background:#cfc;"
| 37 || January 13 || Pittsburgh Penguins || 6–2 ||  || Quick || Crypto.com Arena || 14,348 || 19–13–5 || 43 || 
|- style="background:#cfc;"
| 38 || January 15 || @ Seattle Kraken || 3–1 || || Petersen || Climate Pledge Arena || 17,151 || 20–13–5 || 45 || 
|- style="background:#fcc;"
| 39 || January 17 || @ San Jose Sharks || 2–6 || || Quick || SAP Center || 10,705 || 20–14–5 || 45 || 
|- style="background:#fcc;"
| 40 || January 18 || Tampa Bay Lightning || 4–6 || || Petersen || Crypto.com Arena || 15,128 || 20–15–5 || 45 || 
|- style="background:#fcc;"
| 41 || January 20 || Colorado Avalanche || 1–4 ||  || Quick || Crypto.com Arena || 15,387 || 20–16–5 || 45 || 
|- style="background:#cfc;"
| 42 || January 23 || @ New Jersey Devils || 3–2 ||  || Petersen || Prudential Center || 11,354 || 21–16–5 || 47 || 
|- style="background:#fff;"
| 43 || January 24 || @ New York Rangers || 2–3 || SO || Quick || Madison Square Garden || 15,666 || 21–16–6 || 48 || 
|- style="background:#cfc;"
| 44 || January 27 || @ New York Islanders || 3–2 ||  || Petersen || UBS Arena || 17,255 || 22–16–6 || 50 || 
|- style="background:#fff;"
| 45 || January 29 || @ Philadelphia Flyers || 3–4 || OT || Quick || Wells Fargo Center || 13,763 || 22–16–7 || 51 || 
|- style="background:#cfc;"
| 46 || January 30 || @ Pittsburgh Penguins || 4–3 ||  || Petersen || PPG Paints Arena || 18,237 || 23–16–7 || 53 || 
|-

|- style="background:#cfc;"
| 47 || February 2 || @ Detroit Red Wings || 5–3 || || Quick || Little Caesars Arena || 11,553 || 24–16–7 || 55 || 
|- style="background:#fcc;"
| 48 || February 15 || Edmonton Oilers || 2–5 || || Petersen || Crypto.com Arena || 15,494 || 24–17–7 || 55 || 
|- style="background:#cfc;"
| 49 || February 18 || @ Vegas Golden Knights || 4–3 || OT || Quick || T-Mobile Arena || 18,238 || 25–17–7 || 57 || 
|- style="background:#cfc;"
| 50 || February 19 || @ Arizona Coyotes || 5–3 || || Petersen || Gila River Arena || 13,831 || 26–17–7 || 59 || 
|- style="background:#cfc;"
| 51 || February 23 || @ Arizona Coyotes || 3–2 || || Petersen || Gila River Arena || 9,415 || 27–17–7 || 61 || 
|- style="background:#cfc;"
| 52 || February 25 || @ Anaheim Ducks || 4–1 ||  || Quick || Honda Center || 17,174 || 28–17–7  || 63 ||   
|- style="background:#cfc;"
| 53 || February 26 || New York Islanders || 5–2 || || Petersen || Crypto.com Arena || 18,230 || 29–17–7 || 65 ||
|- style="background:#fcc;"
| 54 || February 28 || Boston Bruins || 0–7 || || Quick || Crypto.com Arena || 16,067 || 29–18–7 || 65 || 
|-

|- style="background:#fcc;"
| 55 || March 2 || @ Dallas Stars || 3–4 ||  || Petersen || American Airlines Center || 18,046 || 29–19–7 || 65 || 
|- style="background:#cfc;"
| 56 || March 4 || @ Columbus Blue Jackets || 4–3 || OT || Quick || Nationwide Arena || 15,778 || 30–19–7 || 67 || 
|- style="background:#cfc;"
| 57 || March 6 || @ Buffalo Sabres || 3–0 ||  || Petersen || KeyBank Center || 10,775 || 31–19–7 || 69 || 
|- style="background:#cfc;"
| 58 || March 7 || @ Boston Bruins || 3–2 || OT || Petersen || TD Garden || 17,850 || 32–19–7 || 71 || 
|- style="background:#fff;"
| 59 || March 10 || San Jose Sharks || 3–4 || OT || Quick || Crypto.com Arena || 14,228 || 32–19–8 || 72 || 
|- style="background:#fcc;"
| 60 || March 12 || @ San Jose Sharks || 0–5 ||  || Petersen || SAP Center || 13,821 || 32–20–8 || 72 || 
|- style="background:#cfc;"
| 61 || March 13 || Florida Panthers || 3–2 || SO || Quick || Crypto.com Arena || 15,822 || 33–20–8 || 74 || 
|- style="background:#fcc;"
| 62 || March 15 || Colorado Avalanche || 0–3 ||  || Quick || Crypto.com Arena || 13,967 || 33–21–8 || 74 || 
|- style="background:#cfc;"
| 63 || March 17 || San Jose Sharks || 3–0 ||  || Petersen || Crypto.com Arena || 13,137 || 34–21–8 || 76 || 
|- style="background:#fcc;"
| 64 || March 19 || @ Vegas Golden Knights || 1–5 ||  || Petersen || T-Mobile Arena || 18,136 || 34–22–8 || 76 || 
|- style="background:#cfc;"
| 65 || March 22 || Nashville Predators || 6–1 ||  || Quick || Crypto.com Arena || 12,629 || 35–22–8 || 78 || 
|- style="background:#fff;"
| 66 || March 24 || Chicago Blackhawks || 3–4 || SO || Quick || Crypto.com Arena || 13,518 || 35–22–9 || 79 || 
|- style="background:#cfc;"
| 67 || March 26 || Seattle Kraken || 4–2 ||  || Petersen || Crypto.com Arena || 18,230 || 36–22–9 || 81 || 
|- style="background:#fcc;"
| 68 || March 28 || Seattle Kraken || 1–6 ||  || Petersen || Crypto.com Arena || 13,919 || 36–23–9 || 81 || 
|- style="background:#fff;"
| 69 || March 30 || @ Edmonton Oilers || 3–4 || SO || Quick || Rogers Place || 16,472 || 36–23–10 || 82 || 
|- style="background:#cfc;"
| 70 || March 31 || @ Calgary Flames || 3–2 || SO || Petersen || Scotiabank Saddledome || 16,398 || 37–23–10 || 84 || 
|-

|- style="background:#cfc;"
| 71 || April 2 || @ Winnipeg Jets || 3–2 || || Petersen || Canada Life Centre || 14,067 || 38–23–10 || 86 || 
|- style="background:#fcc;"
| 72 || April 4 || Calgary Flames || 2–3 || || Petersen || Crypto.com Arena || 13,464 || 38–24–10 || 86 || 
|- style="background:#fcc;"
| 73 || April 7 || Edmonton Oilers || 2–3 || || Quick || Crypto.com Arena || 15,149 || 38–25–10 || 86 || 
|- style="background:#fcc;" 
| 74 || April 10 || @ Minnesota Wild || 3–6 || || Petersen || Xcel Energy Center || 19,104 || 38–26–10 || 86 || 
|- style="background:#cfc;"
| 75 || April 12 || @ Chicago Blackhawks || 5–2 || || Quick || United Center || 18,032 || 39–26–10 || 88 || 
|- style="background:#fcc;"
| 76 || April 13 || @ Colorado Avalanche || 3–9 ||  || Petersen || Ball Arena || 18,017 || 39–27–10 || 88 || 
|- style="background:#cfc;"
| 77 || April 16 || Columbus Blue Jackets || 2–1 ||  || Quick || Crypto.com Arena || 18,230 || 40–27–10 || 90 || 
|- style="background:#cfc;"
| 78 || April 19 || @ Anaheim Ducks || 2–1 ||  || Quick || Honda Center || 17,174 || 41–27–10 || 92 || 
|- style="background:#cfc;"
| 79 || April 21 || Chicago Blackhawks || 4–1 ||  || Quick || Crypto.com Arena || 18,230 || 42–27–10 || 94 || 
|- style="background:#cfc;"
| 80 || April 23 || Anaheim Ducks || 4–2 ||  || Quick || Crypto.com Arena || 18,230 || 43–27–10 || 96 || 
|- style="background:#cfc;"
| 81 || April 27 || @ Seattle Kraken || 5–3 ||  || Quick || Climate Pledge Arena || 17,151 || 44–27–10 || 98 || 
|- style="background:#fff;"
| 82 || April 28 || @ Vancouver Canucks || 2–3 || OT || Petersen || Rogers Arena || 18,779 || 44–27–11 || 99 || 
|-

|-
| 2021–22 schedule

Playoffs

Player statistics

Skaters

Goaltenders

†Denotes player spent time with another team before joining the Kings. Stats reflect time with the Kings only.
‡Denotes player was traded mid-season. Stats reflect time with the Kings only.
Bold/italics denotes franchise record.

Transactions
The Kings have been involved in the following transactions during the 2021–22 season.

Trades

Players acquired

Players lost

Signings

Draft picks

Below are the Los Angeles Kings selections at the 2021 NHL Entry Draft, which will be held on July 23 and 24, 2021, virtually via video conference call from the NHL Network studio in Secaucus, New Jersey, due to the COVID-19 pandemic.

References

Los Angeles Kings seasons
Los Angeles Kings
Kings
Kings
Kings
Kings